{{DISPLAYTITLE:Glucose 1-dehydrogenase (NADP+)}}

In enzymology, a glucose 1-dehydrogenase (NADP+) is an enzyme that catalyzes the chemical reaction

D-glucose + NADP+  D-glucono-1,5-lactone + NADPH + H+

Thus, the two substrates of this enzyme are D-glucose and NADP+, whereas its 3 products are D-glucono-1,5-lactone, NADPH, and H+.

This enzyme belongs to the family of oxidoreductases, specifically those acting on the CH-OH group of donor with NAD+ or NADP+ as acceptor. The systematic name of this enzyme class is D-glucose:NADP+ 1-oxidoreductase. Other names in common use include nicotinamide adenine dinucleotide phosphate-linked aldohexose, dehydrogenase, NADP+-linked aldohexose dehydrogenase, NADP+-dependent glucose dehydrogenase, and glucose 1-dehydrogenase (NADP+).

References

 
 

EC 1.1.1
NADPH-dependent enzymes
Enzymes of unknown structure